Apolônio de Carvalho (9 February 1912 – 23 September 2005) was a Brazilian socialist and military officer important in the history of the Workers' Party (Brazil). Due to his communist ideals, Carvalho was expelled from the Brazilian Army and left for Spain to fight alongside the republicans in the Spanish Civil War and afterwards against the Nazis in occupied France, reaching the rank of colonel in the French Army. Considered a hero in France, he was awarded the Legion of Honour among other decorations for bravery.

Biography 
Carvalho was born in Mato Grosso into a military family of working-class origin. His father was from northeastern Brazil and his mother was a gaucha from the south of the country. He was arrested and imprisoned, and upon his release in 1937 he became a member of the Brazilian Communist Party. 

Soon after his release Carvalho joined the International Brigades in Spain, thus using his military training to fight fascism. In 1939, after General Francisco Franco's victory, he fled to France and soon became involved with the French Resistance. Though he was at one time captured and tortured by the Gestapo, he later escaped and became a colonel leading 2000 men, and at the end of the War was awarded the Legion of Honour.

Carvalho returned to Brazil and partook in an attempt to depose dictator Getuilo Vargas, and was subsequently stripped of his position as lieutenant in the Brazilian Army. After the 1964 military coup he criticised the Brazilian Communist Party for refusing to engage in guerilla warfare, as well as for their authoritarian and instrumental methods. In 1967 he was finally expelled and founded the Brazilian Revolutionary Communist Party a year later to continue armed struggle against the dictatorship. In 1979 Carvalho returned to Brazil as the military dictatorship had become weaker, and took part in forming the Workers' Party (PT) the following year. He was also for a time its vice president.

He died in 2005, at a time when his party was in power but had accommodated neo-liberal economics and was accused of corruption. The week he died, many members of the Workers' Party were tearing up their membership cards – of which his was the first (0001). He himself, however, believed that the party could be reclaimed.

See also
 Suresh Biswas
Charlie Hutchison
Joseph Beyrle
Yang Kyoungjong

Footnotes

External links 
 
 
 

1912 births
2005 deaths
People from Corumbá
Workers' Party (Brazil) politicians
Brazilian expatriates in France
Brazilian expatriates in the Soviet Union
Communist members of the French Resistance

Brazilian expatriates in Algeria
French Resistance members
20th-century Brazilian military personnel
International Brigades personnel
Brazilian communists